Erich Retter (17 February 1925 – 27 December 2014) was a German footballer.

Club career 
With VfB Stuttgart he won twice the German football championship in 1950 and 1952.

International career 
Retter won 14 caps for West Germany between 1952 and 1954. After appearing regularly for the team before tournament he missed out the 1954 FIFA World Cup which West Germany won because of an injury.

External links

References

1925 births
2014 deaths
German footballers
Association football defenders
Germany international footballers
VfB Stuttgart players
People from Schorndorf
West German footballers
Sportspeople from Stuttgart (region)
Footballers from Baden-Württemberg